Lepidophyma micropholis, the cave tropical night lizard, is a species of lizard in the family Xantusiidae. It is a small lizard found in Mexico. It is native to caves in the Sierra del Abra Tanchipa, part of the Sierra Madre Oriental in eastern San Luis Potosí and adjacent southern Tamaulipas states.

References

Lepidophyma
Endemic reptiles of Mexico
Fauna of the Sierra Madre Oriental
Reptiles described in 1955